Evangelos Menexis was a Greek weightlifter. He competed in the men's lightweight event at the 1920 Summer Olympics.

References

External links
 

Year of birth missing
Year of death missing
Greek male weightlifters
Olympic weightlifters of Greece
Weightlifters at the 1920 Summer Olympics
Place of birth missing